John Newcombe and Tony Roche defeated Tom Okker and Marty Riessen 6–2, 7–6 in the final to win the men's doubles title at the 1971 Australian Open.

Seeds
The top four seeds receive a bye into the second round.

  John Newcombe /  Tony Roche (champions)
  Roy Emerson /  Rod Laver (quarterfinals)
  Ken Rosewall /  Fred Stolle (quarterfinals)
  Tom Okker /  Marty Riessen (final)
  Arthur Ashe /  Dennis Ralston (semifinals)
  William Bowrey /  Owen Davidson (quarterfinals)
  Andrés Gimeno /  Roger Taylor (first round)
  Cliff Drysdale /  Greg Perkins (first round)

Draw

Finals

Section 1

Section 2

References

External links
 1971 Australian Open – Men's draws and results at the International Tennis Federation

Men's Doubles
Australian Open (tennis) by year – Men's doubles